Haunted Castle is a side-scrolling platform game released by Konami for the arcades in 1987. It is the second arcade game in the Castlevania franchise, following Vs. Castlevania, an arcade port of the original 1986 NES video game released exclusively in North America. Unlike the previous arcade title in the franchise, Haunted Castle is not a direct port of an existing console game,  but a newly-developed arcade game running on custom JAMMA-based board.

The game has the player controlling Simon Belmont, who embarks on a journey to save his wife Selena from the clutches of Dracula.

Gameplay

Haunted Castle is a platform game with six stages, which are played through in a linear progression. The player controls the main character, whose primary weapon is a whip. He must fight various enemies which consist partially of skeletons, zombies, mermen, and hunchbacks. By destroying certain enemies, he can upgrade his primary weapon first to a more powerful spiked morning star, then to a sword. In addition, various "sub-weapons" can be obtained which provide different means of attack which consist of bombs (powerful ground attack), boomerangs (straight attack), stopwatches (freezes enemies), crosses (powerful straight attack), and torches (continuous ground attack). Hearts are collected to use the sub-weapons. The player can only carry one sub-weapon at a time.

Each of Haunted Castles six levels conclude with a boss fight. Like in other games of the series, these bosses are generally taken from horror literature or legend, and include Medusa, Frankenstein's monster, and Dracula himself.

Development

Audio

The soundtrack was composed in part by Kenichi Matsubara, who previously worked on the soundtrack of Castlevania II: Simon's Quest. There are several music tracks in Haunted Castle that have been reused in other Castlevania games. "Bloody Tears", first heard in the previously released Castlevania II, is used as the theme for Stage 3. Another arcade piece, the Stage 1 theme "Cross Your Heart", was reused in Castlevania: Portrait of Ruin under the title "Crucifix Held Close" and as an unlockable song in Castlevania: The Dracula X Chronicles. It is part of the "Akumajo Dracula Medley" that appears in Konami's Dance Dance Revolution Ultramix 3 (originally appearing in the Japanese arcade and PlayStation 2 music game series Keyboardmania), along with "Bloody Tears". "Clockwork's Beat", which plays during Stage 5, was remixed in Castlevania: Dawn of Sorrow under the name "Underground Melodies" (actually the name of Haunted Castles Stage 4 theme). Finally, "Don't Wait Until Night", played during Stage 6, which borrows hints of "The Silence of Daylight" (the town music from Castlevania II),, was remixed in Castlevania: Aria of Sorrow for Julius' theme "Heart of Fire", though this particular song is actually a medley of the Haunted Castle tune and "Heart of Fire" from Stage 5 of the original Castlevania.

Releases
A PlayStation 2 port of Haunted Castle was released by game publisher Hamster in May 2006 as part of the Oretachi Gēsen Zoku series. This port was only released in Japan.

In September 2017, Hamster released the game for the PlayStation 4 as part of their Arcade Archives line of digital releases. This version includes the option to play the Japanese, North American and European versions of the game. Haunted Castle is also included in Konami's Arcade Classics Anniversary Collection, released digitally on April 19, 2019 for the PlayStation 4, Xbox One, Nintendo Switch and PC (via Steam). Unlike the stand-alone Arcade Archive release, this version varies depending on the region.

Reception 

In Japan, Game Machine listed Haunted Castle on their April 1, 1988, issue as being the sixth most-popular arcade game at the time.

Time Extension placed Haunted Castle last on its list of ranked Castlevania games. It was described that "It starts off well enough; the sprites are nice and large (a fact that makes it hard to avoid danger) and there are some amazing tunes here. However, the brutal difficulty level is clearly designed to suck in coins, and the controls feel stiff and awkward. [...] Outside of saying you've played it, there's little reason to seek this one out. It's dreadful."

Notes

References

1987 video games
1980s horror video games
Arcade video games
Castlevania games
Nintendo Switch games
PlayStation 2 games
PlayStation 4 games
Video games developed in Japan
Single-player video games
Hamster Corporation games